Rhinomyodes is a genus of flies in the family Tachinidae.

Species
R. emporomyioides Townsend, 1933

References

Diptera of Asia
Exoristinae
Tachinidae genera
Taxa named by Charles Henry Tyler Townsend